This is How You Will Die is an interactive digital poetry and art game created by Jason Nelson, a new media artist, digital poet, and lecturer. Released in 2005, the game combines elements of poetry, digital art, and chance-based mechanics to explore the concept of death and the unpredictability of life. The work has been praised for its innovative approach to digital poetry and its thought-provoking content.

Content 
The work enacts a slot machine predicting how the reader will die, and has been described as "an aleatoric gambling machine predicting the cause, nature, and aftermath of the player's death." Leonardo Flores writes that the "playful interfaces and darkly humorous tone serve as a kind of sugar coating for serious themes and personal exploration". Scott Rettberg argues that "the combinatory element is effective here because the arbitrary nature of the random element is, in fact, no less arbitrary, and no less absurd, than mortality itself.

Reception 
The work has been taught at a number of universities. It has been the object of a number of scholarly interpretations, is frequently mentioned in discussions of new media art, and has also received attention from mainstream media.

Awards 
The work won the First Panliterary Award for Web Art from the literary journal Drunken Boat. One of the judges, Talan Memmott, described it as "a thorough example of the power of inference through an integrated use of media technologies and methods of signification".

References

External links 

 Entry in the Electronic Literature Directory
 Entry in ELMCIP Electronic Literature Knowledge Base
 Entry in Rhizome ArtBase

2006 video games
2006 in Internet culture
Electronic literature works
Art games
New media art
Poems
Video games about death